is a railway station of the Chitose Line located in Eniwa, Hokkaidō, Japan.

Railway stations in Hokkaido Prefecture
Eniwa, Hokkaido
Railway stations in Japan opened in 1926